909 Ulla is a large and dark asteroid from the outermost regions of the asteroid belt, that measures approximately  in diameter. It is the parent body and namesake of the Ulla family, which belongs to the larger group of Cybele asteroids. It was discovered on 7 February 1919, by German astronomer Karl Reinmuth at the Heidelberg Observatory in southwest Germany. The X-type asteroid has a rotation period of 8.7 hours and a notably low value for its Jupiter Tisserand's parameter. It was named after Ulla Ahrens, daughter of a friend of the discoverer.

Orbit and classification 

Ulla is the parent body of the Ulla family, a very small asteroid family of less than 30 known bodies. It orbits the Sun in the outermost asteroid belt at a distance of 3.2–3.9 AU once every 6 years and 8 months (2,435 days; semi-major axis of 3.54 AU). Its orbit has an eccentricity of 0.09 and an inclination of 19° with respect to the ecliptic.

Naming 

This minor planet was named after Ulla Ahrens, a daughter of a friend of the discoverer. Karl Reinmuth also named the asteroid 950 Ahrensa for the Ahrens family, who was a donor of the Heidelberg Observatory. The official naming citation was mentioned in The Names of the Minor Planets by Paul Herget in 1955.

Physical characteristics 

In the SMASS classification, Ulla is an X-type asteroid.

Rotation period 

A rotational lightcurve of Ulla was obtained from photometric observations in 2000. Lightcurve analysis gave a rotation period of 8.73 hours with a brightness amplitude between 0.13 and 0.24 magnitude. Other photometric period determinations gave concurring results.

Diameter and albedo 

The Collaborative Asteroid Lightcurve Link uses an albedo of 0.0450 and derives a diameter of 116.66 kilometers based on an absolute magnitude of 8.65.

References

External links 
 Lightcurve Database Query (LCDB), at www.minorplanet.info
 Dictionary of Minor Planet Names, Google books
 Asteroids and comets rotation curves, CdR – Geneva Observatory, Raoul Behrend
 Discovery Circumstances: Numbered Minor Planets (1)-(5000) – Minor Planet Center
 
 

000909
000909
Discoveries by Karl Wilhelm Reinmuth
Named minor planets
000909
19190207